Benjamin Ayimba (27 August 1976 – 22 May 2021) was a rugby player and coach of the Kenya sevens rugby team.

Career 
Ayimba played for Nondescripts RFC 2002 before moving to Cornish Pirates in England between 2003 and 2005. He played in the Kenya Sevens squad that featured in the 2001 and 2005 Rugby World Cup Sevens tournaments in Argentina and Hong Kong respectively. He also represented Kenya at the 1998, 2002 and 2006 Commonwealth Games. He coached the Kenya national rugby sevens team between 2006 and 2011 and again between 2015 and 2016.

Death 
On 22 May 2021, Ayimba died from Cerebral Malaria.

References 

Kenya international rugby sevens players
2021 deaths
1976 births
Cornish Pirates players
Deaths from malaria
Commonwealth Games rugby sevens players
Place of birth missing
Place of death missing
Olympic rugby sevens players of Kenya
Rugby sevens players at the 2016 Summer Olympics
Rugby sevens players at the 1998 Commonwealth Games